In computer science, a suffix automaton is an efficient data structure for representing the substring index of a given string which allows the storage, processing, and retrieval of compressed information about all its substrings. The suffix automaton of a string  is the smallest directed acyclic graph with a dedicated initial vertex and a set of "final" vertices, such that paths from the initial vertex to final vertices represent the suffixes of the string.

In terms of automata theory, a suffix automaton is the minimal partial deterministic finite automaton that recognizes the set of suffixes of a given string . The state graph of a suffix automaton is called a directed acyclic word graph (DAWG), a term that is also sometimes used for any deterministic acyclic finite state automaton.

Suffix automata were introduced in 1983 by a group of scientists from the University of Denver and the University of Colorado Boulder. They suggested a linear time online algorithm for its construction and showed that the suffix automaton of a string  having length at least two characters has at most   states and at most  transitions. Further works have shown a close connection between suffix automata and suffix trees, and have outlined several generalizations of suffix automata, such as compacted suffix automaton obtained by compression of nodes with a single outgoing arc.

Suffix automata provide efficient solutions to problems such as substring search and computation of the largest common substring of two and more strings.

History 

The concept of suffix automaton was introduced in 1983 by a group of scientists from University of Denver and University of Colorado Boulder consisting of Anselm Blumer, Janet Blumer, Andrzej Ehrenfeucht, David Haussler and Ross McConnell, although similar concepts had earlier been studied alongside suffix trees in the works of Peter Weiner, Vaughan Pratt and Anatol Slissenko. In their initial work, Blumer et al. showed a suffix automaton built for the string  of length greater than  has at most  states and at most  transitions, and suggested a linear algorithm for automaton construction.

In 1983, Mu-Tian Chen and Joel Seiferas independently showed that Weiner's 1973 suffix-tree construction algorithm while building a suffix tree of the string  constructs a suffix automaton of the reversed string  as an auxiliary structure. In 1987, Blumer et al. applied the compressing technique used in suffix trees to a suffix automaton and invented the compacted suffix automaton, which is also called the compacted directed acyclic word graph (CDAWG). In 1997, Maxime Crochemore and Renaud Vérin developed a linear algorithm for direct CDAWG construction. In 2001, Shunsuke Inenaga et al. developed an algorithm for construction of CDAWG for a set of words given by a trie.

Definitions 
Usually when speaking about suffix automata and related concepts, some notions from formal language theory and automata theory are used, in particular:

 "Alphabet" is a finite set  that is used to construct words. Its elements are called "characters";
 "Word" is a finite sequence of characters .
 "Formal language" is a set of words over given alphabet;
 "Language of all words" is denoted as (where the "*" character stands for Kleene star), "empty word" (the word of zero length) is denoted by the character ;

Automaton structure 
Formally, deterministic finite automaton is determined by 5-tuple , where:

  is an "alphabet" that is used to construct words,
  is a set of automaton "states",
  is an "initial" state of automaton,
  is a set of "final" states of automaton,

Most commonly, deterministic finite automaton is represented as a directed graph ("diagram") such that:

 Set of graph vertices corresponds to the state of states ,
 Graph has a specific marked vertex corresponding to initial state ,
 Graph has several marked vertices corresponding to the set of final states ,
 Set of graph arcs corresponds to the set of transitions ,

In terms of its diagram, the automaton recognizes the word  only if there is a path from the initial vertex  to some final vertex  such that concatenation of characters on this path forms . The set of words recognized by an automaton forms a language that is set to be recognized by the automaton.

Automaton states 

Right contexts induce a natural equivalence relation  on the set of all words. If language  is recognized by some deterministic finite automaton, there exists unique up to isomorphism automaton that recognizes the same language and has the minimum possible number of states. Such an automaton is called a minimal automaton for the given language . Myhill–Nerode theorem allows it to define it explicitly in terms of right contexts:

In these terms, a "suffix automaton" is the minimal deterministic finite automaton recognizing the language of suffixes of the word . It allows to formulate the following lemma defining a bijection between the right context of the word and the set of right positions of its occurrences in :

In this example, the element  corresponds with the word  while the word  corresponds with the element .

It implies several structure properties of suffix automaton states. Let , then:

 If  and  have at least one common element , then  and  have a common element as well.
In the example above  and it holds for "intermediate" suffix  that .

Any state  of the suffix automaton recognizes some continuous chain of nested suffixes of the longest word recognized by this state.

It holds:

It also holds:

Connection with suffix trees 

A "prefix tree" (or "trie") is a rooted directed tree in which arcs are marked by characters in such a way no vertex  of such tree has two out-going arcs marked with the same character. Some vertices in trie are marked as final. Trie is said to recognize a set of words defined by paths from its root to final vertices. In this way prefix trees are a special kind of deterministic finite automata if you perceive its root as an initial vertex. The "suffix trie" of the word  is a prefix tree recognizing a set of its suffixes. "A suffix tree" is a tree obtained from a suffix trie via the compaction procedure, during which consequent edges are merged if the degree of the vertex between them is equal to two.

By its definition, a suffix automaton can be obtained via minimization of the suffix trie. It may be shown that a compacted suffix automaton is obtained by both minimization of the suffix tree (if one assumes each string on the edge of the suffix tree is a solid character from the alphabet) and compaction of the suffix automaton. Besides this connection between the suffix tree and the suffix automaton of the same string there is as well a connection between the suffix automaton of the string  and the suffix tree of the reversed string .

If one considers right extensions with respect to the language  of "prefixes" of the string  it may be obtained:

, which implies the suffix link tree of the string  and the suffix tree of the string  are isomorphic:

Similarly to the case of left extensions, the following lemma holds for right extensions:

Size 
A suffix automaton of the string  of length  has at most  states and at most  transitions. These bounds are reached on strings  and  correspondingly.

Construction 
Initially the automaton only consists of a single state corresponding to the empty word, then characters of the string are added one by one and the automaton is rebuilt on each step incrementally.

State updates 
After a new character is appended to the string, some equivalence classes are altered.

In other words, if , then . After the addition of a new character at most two equivalence classes of  will be split and each of them may split in at most two new classes. First, equivalence class corresponding to empty right context is always split into two equivalence classes, one of them corresponding to  itself and having  as a right context.

Given the correspondence between states of the suffix automaton and vertices of the suffix tree, it is possible to find out the second state that may possibly split after a new character is appended. Returning to suffix automata, it means the first new state recognizes  and the second one (if there is a second new state) is its suffix link. It may be stated as a lemma:

Besides suffix links it is also needed to define final states of the automaton.

Transitions and suffix links updates 
Words from  occur in  only as its suffixes therefore there should be no transitions at all from  while transitions to it should go from suffixes of  having length at least  and be marked with the character .

Construction algorithm 
Theoretical results above lead to the following algorithm that takes character  and rebuilds the suffix automaton of  into the suffix automaton of :

 Once the aforementioned loop is over, there are 3 cases:
 If the transition is found but , then words from  having length at most  should be segregated into new "clone" state ;

The whole procedure is described by the following pseudo-code:

 function :
     define 
     assign 
     assign 
     while  is undefined:
         assign 
     define 
     if :
         assign 
     else if :
         assign 
     else:
         define 
         assign 
         assign 
         assign 
         while :
             assign 

Complexity 
Complexity of the algorithm may vary depending on the underlying structure used to store transitions of the automaton. To obtain such complexity, one has to use the methods of amortized analysis. The value of  strictly reduces with each iteration of the cycle while it may only increase by as much as one after the first iteration of the cycle on the next add_letter call. Overall value of  never exceeds  and it is only increased by one between iterations of appending new letters that suggest total complexity is at most linear as well. The linearity of the second cycle is shown in a similar way.

Generalizations 
The suffix automaton is closely related to other suffix structures and substring indices. Given a suffix automaton of a specific string one may construct its suffix tree via compacting and recursive traversal in linear time. Other than this several generalizations were developed to construct an automaton for the set of strings given by trie, compacted suffix automation (CDAWG), to maintain the structure of the automaton on the sliding window, and to construct it in a bidirectional way, supporting the insertion of a characters to both the beginning and the end of the string.

Compacted suffix automaton 
As was already mentioned above, a compacted suffix automaton is obtained via both compaction of a regular suffix automaton (by removing states which are non-final and have exactly one out-going arc) and the minimization of a suffix tree. Similarly to the regular suffix automaton, states of compacted suffix automaton may be defined in explicit manner. In terms of two-way extensions compacted automaton is defined as follows:

Two-way extensions induce an equivalence relation  which defines the set of words recognized by the same state of compacted automaton. If words  and  have same right extensions, and words  and  have same left extensions, then cumulatively all strings ,  and  have same two-way extensions. That being said, while equivalence relations of one-way extensions were formed by some continuous chain of nested prefixes or suffixes, bidirectional extensions equivalence relations are more complex and the only thing one may conclude for sure is that strings with the same two-way extension are substrings of the longest string having the same two-way extension, but it may even happen that they don't have any non-empty substring in common. The total number of equivalence classes for this relation does not exceed  which implies that compacted suffix automaton of the string having length  has at most  states. The amount of transitions in such automaton is at most .

Suffix automaton of several strings 
Consider a set of words . It is possible to construct a generalization of suffix automaton that would recognize the language formed up by suffixes of all words from the set. Constraints for the number of states and transitions in such automaton would stay the same as for a single-word automaton if you put . The algorithm is similar to the construction of single-word automaton except instead of  state, function add_letter would work with the state corresponding to the word  assuming the transition from the set of words  to the set .

This idea is further generalized to the case when  is not given explicitly but instead is given by a prefix tree with  vertices. Mohri et al. showed such an automaton would have at most  and may be constructed in linear time from its size. Algorithm suggested by Mohri mainly repeats the generic algorithm for building automaton of several strings but instead of growing words one by one, it traverses the trie in a breadth-first search order and append new characters as it meet them in the traversal, which guarantees amortized linear complexity.

Sliding window 
Some compression algorithms, such as LZ77 and RLE may benefit from storing suffix automaton or similar structure not for the whole string but for only last  its characters while the string is updated. This is because compressing data is usually expressively large and using  memory is undesirable.

The same should be true for the suffix tree because its vertices correspond to states of the suffix automaton of the reversed string but this problem may be resolved by not explicitly storing every vertex corresponding to the suffix of the whole string, thus only storing vertices with at least two out-going edges. A variation of McCreight's suffix tree construction algorithm for this task was suggested in 1989 by Edward Fiala and Daniel Greene; several years later a similar result was obtained with the variation of Ukkonen's algorithm by Jesper Larsson. The existence of such an algorithm, for compacted suffix automaton that absorbs some properties of both suffix trees and suffix automata, was an open question for a long time until it was discovered by Martin Senft and Tomasz Dvorak in 2008, that it is impossible if the alphabet's size is at least two.

One way to overcome this obstacle is to allow window width to vary a bit while staying . It may be achieved by an approximate algorithm suggested by Inenaga et al. in 2004. The window for which suffix automaton is built in this algorithm is not guaranteed to be of length  but it is guaranteed to be at least  and at most  while providing linear overall complexity of the algorithm.

Applications 
Suffix automaton of the string  may be used to solve such problems as:

Suffix automata are also used in data compression, music retrieval and matching on genome sequences.

References

Bibliography

External links

Suffix automaton article on E-Maxx Algorithms in English

String data structures
Finite automata
Algorithms on strings